Maria Kokoszyńska-Lutmanowa (6 December 1905 – 30 June 1981) was "a significant logician, philosopher of language and epistemologist", and "one of the most outstanding female representatives" of the second generation of the Lwów–Warsaw school. She is "mostly known as the author of the important argumentation against neopositivism of the Vienna Circle as well as one of the main critics of relativistic theories of truth". She was also noted for popularising Tarski's works on semantics.

She studied under Kazimierz Twardowski and worked with Kazimierz Ajdukiewicz, and later held the chair of logic at the University of Wrocław.

Selected publications 
 Kokoszyńska, M., (1936), 'Über den absoluten Wahrheitsbegriff und einige andere semantische Begriffe', Erkenntnis 6, 143–156.
 Kokoszyńska, M., (1948), 'What means "relativity of truth"?', Studia Philosophica 3, 167–176.
 Kokoszyńska, M., (1951), 'A refutation of the relativism of truth', Studia Philosophica 4, 1–57.

References

External links 
Brożek, Anna. ‘Maria Kokoszyńska: Between the Lvov-Warsaw School and the Vienna Circle.’ Journal for the History of Analytical Philosophy Vol.5, No.2 (2017). (Open Access)

Works by Maria Kokoszyńska at PhilPapers

1905 births
1981 deaths
Polish logicians
20th-century Polish philosophers
Polish women philosophers
Philosophers of language